Kenneth Leech (15 June 1939 – 12 September 2015), also known as Ken Leech, was an English Anglican priest and Christian socialist in the Anglo-Catholic tradition.

Life and career
Leech was born into a secular working-class family in Ashton-under-Lyne in greater Manchester. As a teenager he became a Christian and a socialist at the same time. A speech denouncing apartheid at the Free Trade Hall in Manchester in 1956 by Trevor Huddleston, a priest of the Community of the Resurrection who had just returned from South Africa, had a particularly powerful impact on him. He would remember thinking, "If this faith could drive this man to oppose racism with such passion, perhaps it could drive me too."

Leech moved to the East End of London in 1958, where he began his studies for a degree in history at King's College, London. This move, he later wrote, was the real turning point of his life. He graduated with a Bachelor of Arts degree in 1961 and then went to Trinity College, Oxford, from which he graduated in 1964. After theological studies at St Stephen's House, Oxford, he was ordained to the diaconate in 1964 and priesthood in 1965. He served in urban London parishes afflicted by poverty and confronted issues of racism and drug abuse. After ordination, he served as a curate at Holy Trinity, Hoxton in the East End of London (1964-67) and then from 1967 to 1971 at St Anne's, Soho.

While in Soho, Leech set up the Soho Drug Group (1967) which ministered to young addicts, many of whom had been drawn into prostitution. In 1969, at the instigation of and in conjunction with Anton Wallich-Clifford and the Simon Community, he established the charity Centrepoint which became the United Kingdom's leading national charity tackling youth homelessness. From 1971 to 1974 he was chaplain and tutor in pastoral studies at St Augustine's College, Canterbury. In 1974 he became rector of St Matthew's Bethnal Green where he served until 1979. While at St Matthew's he became deeply involved in the struggle against the National Front and other racist and fascist groups. In 1974, with Rowan Williams (who later became the Archbishop of Canterbury) and others, he founded the Jubilee Group, a network of Christian socialists in Britain and across the Anglican Communion, most of whom were Anglo-Catholics. In 1980 he became Race Relations Field Officer for the British Council of Churches Community and Race Relations Unit. The following year he was named Race Relations Field Officer of the Church of England's Board for Social Responsibility. He was an honorary assistant curate of St Clement's Church, Notting Dale (1982 to 1988), and of St James' Church, Norlands (1985 to 1988). He was director of the Runnymede Trust, a think tank dedicated to promoting ethnic diversity in Britain, from 1987 to 1990. From 1990 until 2004, when he retired from full-time parish ministry, he was community theologian at St Botolph's Aldgate, a church located at the intersection of the City of London and the East End. As archbishop, Rowan Williams awarded him a Lambeth doctorate.

Leech was an advocate of contextual theology. As much as he admired the work of academic theologians, he insisted that authentic Christian theology could not be confined to the academy or to the pastor's study. He believed that it must be grounded in prayer and should be the work of the entire local Christian community across the boundaries of class, race, and sex. At the heart of his faith was what he called "subversive orthodoxy"; the indissoluble union of contemplative spirituality, sacramental worship, orthodox doctrine and social action. He argued that this conjunction of faith and the quest for justice, which points to the coming of the Kingdom of God on earth, is the essential mark of the Christian life and underlies scripture, the teachings of the Church Fathers and the Christian mystical tradition. His work also drew on the radical and even revolutionary strands in Anglo-Catholicism represented by figures such as Stewart Headlam, Thomas Hancock, Charles Marson, Percy Widdrington, Conrad Noel, and Stanley Evans. He respected the contributions of F. D. Maurice, Brooke Foss Westcott, Charles Gore, William Temple, and other reform-minded Anglican Christian socialists, but thought them often to be too timid and middle class.

Although Leech was critical of theological liberalism, unlike some Anglo-Catholics he supported the ordination of women and the rights of gay and lesbian people. His publications include guides to prayer and spiritual direction, autobiographical reflections on urban ministry and theological critiques of capitalism and social injustice. Of his weightiest theological work, True God (published in the United States as Experiencing God), the philosopher Alasdair MacIntyre wrote that "there are few other books that state in so comprehensive a fashion what is at stake in believing or not believing in the God of Catholic Christianity."

Leech died of cancer in Manchester on 12 September 2015.

Published works

Books authored 

 Drugs for Young People: Their Use and Misuse. With Jordan, Brenda. Oxford: Religious Education Press. 1967.
 
 
 
 
 
 
 
 
 
 
 
 
 
 
 
 
 
 
 
 
 
 
 
 Prayer and Prophecy: The Essential Kenneth Leech. Edited by Bunch, David; Ritchie, Angus. London: Darton, Longman and Todd. 2009. .

Books edited 

 The Book of the Lover and the Beloved. By Llull, Ramon. Editor. Translated by Peers, E. Allison. London: Sheldon Press. 1978. .
 Christianity Reinterpreted? A Critical Examination of the 1978 Reith Lectures. Editor. Jubilee Lent Lectures. 1979. Penarth, Wales: Church in Wales Publications. 1979. .
 Thatcherism. Editor. Jubilee Lent Lectures. 1980. London: Jubilee Group. .
 Till All Be Held Common: Christians and the Debate on Common Ownership Today. Editor. Jubilee Lent Lectures. 1981. London: Jubilee Group. 1982. .
 Essays Catholic and Radical. Edited with Williams, Rowan. London: Bowerdean Press. 1983. .
 After Marx. Editor. Jubilee Lent Lectures. 1983. London: Jubilee Group. 1984. .
 Letters from Seven Churches: Addressed to the Archbishop's Commission on Urban Priority Areas. Edited with Drummond, Terry. Jubilee Lent Lectures. 1984. London: Jubilee Group. 1984. .
 The Bible, Racism and Anti-Semitism. Editor. Theology and Racism. 1. London: Board for Social Responsibility. 1985. .
 Conrad Noel and the Catholic Crusade: A Critical Evaluation. Editor. London: Jubilee Group. 1993. .
 Setting the Church of England Free: The Case for Disestablishment. Editor. London: Jubilee Group. 2001. .

Book chapters 

 "Stewart Headlam". In Reckitt, Maurice B. For Christ and the People: Studies of Four Socialist Priests and Prophets of the Church of England Between 1870 and 1930. London: SPCK. 1968. .
 "The Christian Left in Britain, 1850–1950". In Ambler, Rex; Haslam, David. Agenda for Prophets: Towards a Political Theology for Britain. London: Bowerdean Press. 1980. .
 "Spirituality and Social Justice". In Leech, Kenneth. The Study of Spirituality. New York: Oxford University Press. 1986. pp. 582–583. .
 "Beyond Gin and Lace: Homosexuality and the Anglo-Catholic Subculture". In Beck, Ashley; Hunt, Ros. Speaking Love's Name: Homosexuality: Some Catholic and Socialist Reflections. London: Jubilee Group. 1988. pp. 16–27. . Archived from the original on 5 April 2018.
 "'The Carnality of Grace': Sexuality, Spirituality and Pastoral Ministry". In Woodward, James. Embracing the Chaos: Theological Responses to AIDS. London: SPCK. 1990. pp. 59ff. .
 "The Junkies' Doctors and the London Drug Scene in the 1960s: Some Remembered Fragments". In Whynes, David K.; Bean, Philip T. Policing and Prescribing: The British System of Drug Control. Basingstoke, England: Macmillan. 1991. pp. 35–59. . .
 "Some Light from the Noel Archives". In Leech, Kenneth. Conrad Noel and the Catholic Crusade. London: Jubilee Group. 1993. .
 "Spirituality and Liberation". In Byrne, Peter; Houlden, Leslie. Companion Encyclopedia of Theology. London: Routledge. 1995. pp. 642–664. . .
 "Introduction". In Leech, Kenneth. Setting the Church of England Free: The Case for Disestablishment. London: Jubilee Group. 2001. .
 "The World Turned Upside Down". In Leech, Kenneth. Setting the Church of England Free: The Case for Disestablishment. London: Jubilee Group. 2001. .
 "The Rebel Church in the Back Streets: Where Are We Now?" In Bradstock, Andrew; Rowland, Christopher. Radical Christian Writings: A Reader. Oxford: Blackwell Publishers. 2002. pp. 328–331. .
 "Evans, Stanley George (1912–1965)". In Matthew, H. C. G.; Harrison, Brian. Oxford Dictionary of National Biography. Oxford: Oxford University Press. 2004. . .
 "Groser, St John Beverley (1890–1966)". In Matthew, H. C. G.; Harrison, Brian. Oxford Dictionary of National Biography. Oxford: Oxford University Press. 2004. . .
 "Noel, Conrad Le Despenser Roden (1869–1942)". In Matthew, H. C. G.; Harrison, Brian. Oxford Dictionary of National Biography. Oxford: Oxford University Press. 2004. . .
 "Williamson, Joseph (1895–1988)". In Matthew, H. C. G.; Harrison, Brian. Oxford Dictionary of National Biography. Oxford: Oxford University Press. 2004. . .

Journal articles

Other 

 
 
 
 
 
 
 
 
 "Introduction". In Leicester Consultation. The Church of England and Racism. London: Board for Social Responsibility. 1981. .
 
 
 The Bishops and the Economy: A Jubilee Group Symposium of Responses to the American Roman Catholic Bishops' Pastoral Letter on Catholic Social Teaching and the US Economy. Editor. London: Jubilee Group. 1985. .
 
 
 Julian Reconsidered. With Ward, Benedicta. Oxford: SLG Press. 1988. .
 
 
 
 
 
 
 
 
 Who Will Sound the Trumpet? The Jubilee Group and the Future of the Left. Editor. London: Jubilee Group. 1994. .
 Myers–Briggs: Some Critical Reflections. Editor. London: Jubilee Group. 1996. .

Notes

References

Citations

Works cited

Further reading 

 
 
 
 
 

1939 births
2015 deaths
20th-century Anglican theologians
20th-century English Anglican priests
20th-century English theologians
Alumni of King's College London
Alumni of St Stephen's House, Oxford
Alumni of Trinity College, Oxford
Anglo-Catholic clergy
Anglo-Catholic socialists
Anglo-Catholic theologians
Christian socialist theologians
Anglican clergy from London
English Anglo-Catholics
English Christian socialists
People from Ashton-under-Lyne
Writers from Lancashire
Writers from London